Amanda Bouldin (born December 27, 1984) is an American politician from Manchester, New Hampshire who has served in the New Hampshire House of Representatives since January 2015. Bouldin, a Democrat, represents Hillsborough County's 12th district.

Career

Politics

As a freshman representative, Bouldin introduced two bills addressing heroin use in New Hampshire. HB 270 provided legal protection against arrest and prosecution for individuals calling for medical assistance for someone with an opiate-related medical problem. HB 271 relaxed restrictions on prescribing naloxone, granting authorized health care professionals the power to write a prescription for anyone at risk of an opiate overdose or for a person who knows someone at risk of an opiate overdose.

In December 2015, Bouldin commented on Facebook that a proposed change in New Hampshire's public nudity law that would have allowed men to expose their nipples in public while prohibiting women from exposing their breasts while not breastfeeding was sexist. The comment drew crude comments about Bouldin's breasts from two Republican representatives, Josh Moore and Al Baldasaro.

References

External links
 Representative Amanda Bouldin (New Hampshire General Court)

People from Carrollton, Texas
Democratic Party members of the New Hampshire House of Representatives
Politicians from Manchester, New Hampshire
Place of birth missing (living people)
Living people
American salespeople
1984 births
21st-century American politicians